Typhoon Gerald, known in the Philippines as Typhoon Neneng, affected the Philippines, Taiwan, and China during September 1987. A tropical depression developed on September 4, and within 24 hours, intensified into a tropical storm. After initially moving erratically within the Philippine Sea, Gerald moved west-northwest and then northwest while steadily deepening. Gerald obtained typhoon intensity on September 8, and the following day, attained maximum intensity. Shortly thereafter, the typhoon skirted southwestern Taiwan, which resulted in a steady weakening trend. On September 10, Gerald moved ashore north of Hong Kong near Amoy. Gerald dissipated the next day.

Across the Philippines, the storm caused $4.48 million (1987 USD) in damage but no deaths. Although the system stayed offshore Taiwan, the storm inflicted widespread flooding across the island that took five lives. There, 5,000 families were left without power, and damage exceeded $10 million. Although Gerald weakened considerably prior to making landfall, the storm was still responsible for extensive damage in the Fujian Province, where 76 people perished, and 31 others suffered injuries. In the neighboring Zhejiang Province, 28 people were killed and 71 others sustained injuries. Across China, 4,900 homes were destroyed and 122 fatalities were reported. Damage in the country amounted to $120 million.

Meteorological history

Typhoon Gerald, one of three typhoons to form from the monsoon trough in early September 1987, originated from an area of low pressure that developed to the east of the Philippines over the South China Sea. The Joint Typhoon Warning Center (JTWC) started tracking the low at 06:00 UTC on September 2, after convection persisted. Two and a half hours later, the agency issued a Tropical Cyclone Formation Alert (TCFA), but almost immediately thereafter, shower and thunderstorm activity rapidly diminished due to decreased poleward outflow and increased wind shear. Despite this, the Japan Meteorological Agency (JMA) started tracking the system at 00:00 UTC on September 3. Eight hours later, the TCFA was cancelled.

Although the low initially exhibited features typical of a monsoon trough, surface observations suggested that surface pressures in the vicinity of the low began to fall on September 4. Consequently, the TFCA was re-issued at 10:00 UTC. Eight hours later, Dvorak intensity estimates for the storm reached T2.0/, prompting the JTWC to upgrade the system into a tropical depression, although post-storm analysis from the agency indicated that the system attained tropical depression status at 00:00 UTC on September 4 and tropical storm intensity at 18:00 UTC that day. At 06:00 UTC on September 5, the JMA followed suit and classified Gerald as a tropical storm. Meanwhile, the Philippine Atmospheric, Geophysical and Astronomical Services Administration (PAGASA) also monitored the storm and assigned it with the local name Neneng. The JTWC initially expected Gerald to re-curve east of the Philippines; however, the storm's circulation remained quite shallow and embedded within the monsoon trough, causing Gerald to meander. The JMA upgraded Gerald into severe tropical storm during the evening hours of September 5.

After meandering offshore the Philippines during the storm's formative stages, Gerald began to turn west-northwest and then north-northwest on September 7. Subsequently, the JTWC revised its forecasts, and called for Gerald to track through the Luzon Strait and eventually move into China. Gerald also started to intensify at a faster clip. At 00:00 UTC on September 7, the JTWC reported that Gerald reached typhoon intensity, with the JMA doing the same a mere 12 hours later as an eye first became evident on satellite imagery.

Shortly after its peak, Gerald began to interact with the southwestern coast of Taiwan. This greatly reduced the storm's low-level inflow, which resulted in considerable weakening. The weakening trend persisted as the typhoon entered the Formosa Straits, and at 00:00 UTC on September 10, the JMA downgraded Gerald into a severe tropical storm. Six hours later, the JTWC reported that Gerald was no longer a typhoon. At the time of landfall, the JTWC estimated that Gerald had weakened into a tropical depression, and the JMA had stopped classifying the storm altogether. At 00:00 UTC on September 11, the JTWC ceased following the storm as it was no longer identifiable by surface observations or via satellite imagery.

Preparations, impact, and aftermath
During its formative stages of the typhoon, 177 people – or 32 families – were either homeless or evacuated to shelters in the Philippines. There, damage totaled $4.48 million, with $2.52 million from public infrastructure and $1.94 million from agriculture. However, there were no casualties. Although Gerald did not make landfall in Taiwan, it came close enough to deliver heavy rains and strong winds to the island. Five people were killed. Along the eastern and southeastern coasts portion of Taiwan, roads were cut off due to falling debris and mudslides. Two young boys died due to flash flooding in the capital of Taipei. A worker at a nuclear power plant in the southern tip of the island died due to head injuries suffered during the storm. Two fishermen near Hualien drowned due to storm surge. During the height of the storm, 5,000 households lost power. Overall, five people were killed and damage exceeded $10 million.

Throughout the province, 67 people were killed and 31 other people were injured, many seriously, while  of crops were damaged. Most of the casualties in the province occurred due to collapsed homes. In the neighboring province of Zhejiang, 28 others died and 71 were injured. There, the storm flooded  of crops and destroyed 700 homes. A highway tunnel in Huangyan County collapsed, burying at least 12 people, six of whom were rescued. Most of the district was also isolated from the outside world due to flooding along the Qiantang River. Throughout the Zhejian province, thousands of bridges, dikes and communications equipment were destroyed. Nationwide, 4,900 dwellings were demolished, 102 people sustained injuries, and 122 fatalities occurred. Damage in the country amounted to $120 million. Further south, the storm came close enough to Hong Kong to require a No 1. hurricane signal for about 23 hours starting on September 9. Citywide, the highest recorded wind gust of  occurred at Tate's Cairn. The Hong Kong Royal Observatory also reported a minimum pressure of  while Cheung Chau received  of rain in a five-day time span. Throughout Hong Kong, there were no deaths or damages. Following the storm, the Chinese army was mobilized to provide food and supplies to an estimated 25,400 people that were left homeless.

See also

Typhoon Hal (1985)

Notes

References

External links
 Japan Meteorological Agency
 Joint Typhoon Warning Center 

G
G
G
G
G
G
Gerald